James Mason was a 19th-century footballer and referee. He played for Burslem Port Vale and refereed the 1909 FA Cup Final.

Career
Mason joined Burslem Port Vale in November 1892. He made his debut in a 5–2 home defeat to Newton Heath on 24 December 1894, becoming a regular from March 1895. In 1896 he was reported to be performing 'his usual trick act of shooting at the winding gear of the adjacent colliery or at the clock in the Cobridge Church tower'. He lost his first team place in December 1896, despite this ability. He was suspended by the club in February 1897 for 'offensive conduct' and only made one further appearance, in October 1897. Despite this he actually went on to become a referee after being released in 1898.

He refereed the 1909 FA Cup Final, as well as four England games.

Career statistics
Source:

References

Year of birth missing
Year of death missing
English footballers
Association football forwards
Port Vale F.C. players
English Football League players
English football referees
FA Cup Final referees